The WCK Band (Windward Caribbean Kulture) was formed in 1988 in Dominica. The band played a blend of the local Cadence-lypso and traditional Jing ping, Chante mas and lapo kabwit rhythms, which would later be labelled bouyon, a genre which they are credited with creating in the late 1980s.

History
WCK or Windward Caribbean Kulture, was formed in 1988 by a group of young Dominican musicians. This group came together to fill a void left by several of Dominica's most internationally recognized bands, such as Exile One, Grammacks and the French Antilles Kassav'. The band heralded in a resurgence of live music and created a new wave in Dominica's musical evolution. They began experimenting with a fusion of cadence-lypso and Jing ping. While the cadence-lypso sound is based on the creative use of acoustic drums, an aggressive up-tempo guitar beat and strong social commentary in the native Creole language, the new sound created by WCK focused more on the use of technology with a strong emphasis on keyboard rhythmic patterns.

Wck made its debut in 1988 with an album titled One More Sway, which coincided with the Reunion Year (10th anniversary) Independence celebrations. The next album, 1990's Culture Shock, was probably the defining moment for the band. The album included tracks such as "Culture Shock" and "Dance Floor".

The albums that followed showed the creative growth of the band throughout the years. In 1991, the Follow the Leader album delivered signature tracks such as "Follow the Leader" and "Land Of Sunshine". In 1992, the release of Kannibal was another step towards the fine-tuning of this new sound. The 1993 release FOREVER produced one of the band's biggest hits, "Conch Shell/Vola Vole" or "The Fish Song" (as it was popularly called). In 1995, the band released its most successful album, Tou Cho Tou Flam, which generated seven hits out of the 11-track album, one of which was the huge hit "Balance Batty", which remains popular to this day. By the launch of the band's seventh album, Original Hold Dem, WCK were at the apotheosis of their popularity. That album contained popular tracks like "Mete Veye", "Original Hold Dem", "Nomn La" and "Preg Dance See".

To establish their musical strength, prowess and creativity, the band toured the US, Canada, Europe and the Caribbean from 1995 – 1998. They packed dance halls, concert halls, arenas and any open space they played. That set the stage for the next two albums, Too Many Cooks & Marathon, which propelled the band and its bouyon music into the international spotlight. The reception of their 1999 release Set My People Free demonstrated their continuing popularity.

The 2000 release, Pride and Joy featured tracks such as “The Buzz", "Grand Finale" and title track "Pride & Joy". They followed this up with the well-received Caribbean Heartbeat. In 2002 the band then released On Top. Hits “Emotions" and "Joy Ride" featured T.C from Barbados. Their 2003 album More Music included hits such as "Send your body" and title track "More music". 2004 marked the band's release of their most anticipated album to date, titled www.wck.dm, which featured the hit “rollin”. Follow up albums included Calling and One Boss, which were released in 2007 and 2008 respectively.

Discography

1988 One More Sway
1990 Culture Shock
1991 Follow The Leader
1992 Kannibal
1993 Forever
1994 Traitors On Board
1995 Tou Cho Tou Flam
1996 Original Hold Dem
1997 Too Many Cooks
1998 Marathon
1999 Set My People Free
2000 Pride & Joy
2001 Caribbean Heartbeat
2002 Ontop
2003 More Music
2004 www.Wck.Dm
2006 Calling
2007 One Boss
2010 Superband
2011 Native Crew

Hit Singles

Culture Shock – 1990
Follow the Leader – 1991
Conch Shell/Vola – 1993
Modie Maco – 1994
Tou chou Tou flam – 1995
Balance Batty - 1995
Mete Veye’  - 1996
Drum song  - 1996
Iron – 1997
Kulture nous – 1997
Pots & Pans – 1997
Marathon – 1998
Riddim like rain – 1998
Bouyon Connection - 1998
Set my people free – 1999
Mic Rah Phone – 1999
The buzz - 2000
Pride & joy – 2000
Grand Finale – 2000
Bouncing – 2001
Track after track - 2001
Put A Hand - 2002
Emotions – 2002 (feat Terencia Coward-"TC")
Joy Ride – 2002 (feat Terencia Coward-"TC")
Ontop - 2002
More Music – 2003
Send your body – 2003
Rolling – 2004
Back Together Again - 2005
Best Wuk up – 2006
Hold Dem -2010
I In Dat - 2010 (Feat Claudette "CP" Peters)
Must Go On - 2011
767-2013

Former Band Members

Cornell "Fingaz" Phillip..........(Keyboards/Lead Vocals)
Irvine "Smokey" Phillip..........(Keyboards)
Ashton Lugay........................(Guitar)
Martindale Olive...................(Lead Guitar/Lead Vocal)
Derick "Rah" Peters...............(Drums/Lead Vocals)
Neijel A. Jno Baptiste a.k.a "Nayee" ....... (Lead Vocals/Keyboards)
Dennison Joseph a.k.a "Dice"..... (Lead Vocals)
Wayne "Skinny Banton" Robinson a.k.a "Shadowflow"....(Lead Vocals)
Clint Henderson a.k.a "Charm Daddy".....(Lead Vocals/Keyboards)
Delton Alfred a.k.a "Delly"...... (Lead Vocals)
Pellam Jno Baptiste................(Drums)
Bert Castonguay....................(Keyboards/Lead Vocals)
Keith Goddard ... bass guitar
Wayne McLawrence... guitar
Kenneth Toussaint... lead guitar
Earlson Matthew a.k.a Likkle Man....lead Keyboardist

References

External links
WCK's Official Website

Musical groups established in 1988
WCK